SAP NetWeaver Process Integration (SAP PI) is SAP's enterprise application integration (EAI) software, a component of the NetWeaver product group used to facilitate the exchange of information among a company's internal software and systems and those of external parties. Before the current version, SAP PI was called SAP Exchange Infrastructure (SAP XI). Like other NetWeaver components, SAP PI is compatible with software products of other companies.

SAP calls PI an integration broker because it mediates between entities with varying requirements in terms of connectivity, format, and protocols. According to SAP, PI reduces the TCO by providing a common repository for interfaces. The central component of SAP PI is the SAP Integration Server, which facilitates interaction between diverse operating systems and applications across internal and external networked computer systems.

PI is built upon the SAP Web Application Server.

First release of SAP Exchange Infrastructure was XI 2.0. Later on, releases 3.0, 7.0, 7.1, 7.1 EHP1, 7.3 and 7.31 followed. From release 7.0 onwards, SAP Exchange Infrastructure has been renamed as SAP Process Integration (SAP PI).

Single Sign-On
SAP NetWeaver PI allows for Single Sign-On through SAP Logon Tickets and x.509 certificates. Certificates allow for the usage of Secure Network Communications (SNC) and Secure Sockets Layer (SSL).

Further reading

Brief history of SAP PI

See also
 Comparison of business integration software
 Single Sign-On
 Secure Sockets Layer
 Secure Network Communications
 SAP Logon Ticket

References

External links 
 Process Integration (PI) & SOA Middleware discussions, blogs, documents and videos on the SAP Community Network (SCN)
 SAP NetWeaver Process Integration Overview Page
 SAP Library - SAP NetWeaver Exchange Infrastructure
 Process Integration Handbook by Peter Gutsche (SAP AG)

Enterprise application integration
SAP NetWeaver